Theodore Cole (born April 5, 1971) is a Canadian voice actor who works with Ocean Productions in numerous anime dubs. He's best known for his roles as Tatewaki Kuno in Ranma ½, Chang Wufei in Gundam Wing, Yamcha in the Ocean dub of Dragon Ball Z and Neil in Class of the Titans. He has also done live-action work as well.

Filmography

Anime dubbing
 Dokkoida!? - Pierre the Slave
 Death Note - Reiji Namikawa, Ito Shiroba, John McEnroe/Larry Conners, Jack Neylon/Kal Snydar
 Dragon Ball - Yamcha (Ocean dub)
 Dragon Ball Z (Ocean dub) - Yamcha, Android 17, Jewel, Pui Pui, Korin (Seasons 4–9), Turles
 Dragon Ball Z Kai - Yamcha (Ocean Group Dub)
 Gintama° - Hasegawa
 Hamtaro - Boss, Curtis Milan
 Hikaru no Go - Michio Shirakawa
 Inuyasha - Lord Kuranosuke Takeda
 Master Keaton - Taichi Hiraga Keaton
 Megaman NT Warrior - Glyde
 Mobile Suit Gundam - Wakkein
 Mobile Suit Gundam 00 - David Carnegie, Bolz Assan
 Mobile Suit Gundam SEED - Ray Yuki, Yuri Amalfi
 Mobile Suit Gundam SEED Destiny - Gilbert Durandal
 Mobile Suit Gundam Wing - Chang Wufei
 Monkey Magic - Beedy
 Monster Rancher - Poritoka
 Powerpuff Girls Z - Spaghettihead
 Ranma ½ - Tatewaki Kuno, Hayato Ryujin
 The Story of Saiunkoku - Sho Sai
 Trouble Chocolate - Murakata
 Transformers Cybertron - Sideways
 The Vision of Escaflowne - Excavation Site Leader
 Zoids: Fuzors - Sigma, Jackie
 Zoids: New Century Zero - Leon Toros

Movie roles
 Dragon Ball Z: The Tree of Might - Yamcha
 Inuyasha the Movie: Fire on the Mystic Island - Kyōra
 Ranma ½: Big Trouble in Nekonron, China - Tatewaki Kuno
 Ranma ½: Nihao My Concubine - Tatewaki Kuno
 Gundam Seed: The Rumbling Universe - Ray Yuki
 Gundam Wing: Endless Waltz - Chang Wufei

Non-anime roles
 Class of the Titans - Neil, Phonus, Tartarus Guard, Daedalus, Moviegoer, Bearded Archaeologist, Telchine #3, Farmer Announcing Sybaris's Return
 Littlest Pet Shop - Squeaks
 X-Men: Evolution - Mr. Spear
 Scary Movie - Older Man In Theater
 Death Note - Lind L. Tailor (voice)
 Mobile Suit Gundam: Encounters in Space - Wakkein (voice), Anavel Gato (voice)
 Animated Classic Showcase - Additional Voices
 Camp Candy - Additional Voices
 Stone Protectors The New Adventures of He-Man - Karatti, Slush Head, Spinwit, Staghorn
 Kong: The Animated Series - Rakhir
 Roswell Conspiracies: Aliens, Myths and Legends'' - Additional Voices

External links
 
 

1971 births
Living people
Canadian male film actors
Canadian male voice actors
Canadian male television actors
Canadian impressionists (entertainers)
Male actors from Vancouver
20th-century Canadian male actors
21st-century Canadian male actors